Perth is an unincorporated community in Dick Johnson Township, Clay County, Indiana. It is part of the Terre Haute Metropolitan Statistical Area.

Geography

History
Perth had its start in the year 1870 by the building of the railroad through that territory. It was named after Perth, Scotland, not Perth, Western Australia. A post office was established at Perth in 1880, and remained in operation until it was discontinued in 1929.

References

Unincorporated communities in Clay County, Indiana
Unincorporated communities in Indiana
Terre Haute metropolitan area